Kee of Hearts is the eponymous first album by supergroup Kee of Hearts (Kee Marcello/Tommy Heart). It was released via Neapolitan label Frontiers Records on 15 September 2017, anticipated by singles "A New Dimension" on 27 June, "The Storm" on 13 July, "Bridge to Heaven" on August 17 and "Crimson Dawn" on 6 September. It was produced by Italian multi-instrumentalist Alessandro Del Vecchio, also involved as songwriter, keyboardist and backing vocalist.

The Japanese edition was released in Japan on 30 August via Marquee anche it contains an acoustic version of the song "Invincible" as a bonus track.

Track listing

Personnel

Tommy Heart - vocals
Kee Marcello - guitars
Ken Sandin - bass guitars
Marco Di Salvia - drums

Additional personnel

Serafino Perugino - executive producer
Alessandro Del Vecchio - producing, mixing, mastering, keyboards, backing vocals 
Maor Appelbaum - remastering
Andrea Seveso - studio assistant
Mattia Stancioiu - studio assistant
Anders Fästader - artwork
Johnny Pixel - pictures

References

2017 debut albums
Hard rock albums